Judge Schofield may refer to:

Lorna G. Schofield (born 1956), judge of the United States District Court for the Southern District of New York
William Schofield (1857–1912), judge of the United States Court of Appeals for the First Circuit